Glenn Gaylord is an American film and television director, producer and screenwriter. His credits include the feature films Eating Out 3: All You Can Eat, Leave It on the Floor, Lez Be Friends and I Do, the documentary Camp Michael Jackson, the short films Boychick, Lost Cause, and Little BFFs, and episodes of the television series What Perez Sez, Tori & Dean: Inn Love and Queer Eye for the Straight Girl.

I Do has won 12 film festival awards and garnered a North American theatrical release on May 31, 2013, as well as Video on Demand (iTUNES, Amazon, Cable). He is a fellow of the Film Independent Screenwriter Lab with Directed By Dorothy Arzner, a script he co-wrote with Christine J. Russo.

Openly gay, he was an HIV/AIDS educator with AIDS Project Los Angeles before beginning to work in film and television.

References

External links

American film directors
American television directors
American documentary filmmakers
American male screenwriters
American television writers
American film producers
American television producers
LGBT film directors
LGBT television directors
LGBT producers
American LGBT screenwriters
American gay writers
Living people
American male television writers
Year of birth missing (living people)